Neighborhoods in Detroit provides a general overview of neighborhoods and historic districts within the city. Neighborhood names and boundaries vary in their formality; some are well defined and long established, while others are more informal. Further names and boundaries have evolved over time due to development or changes in demographics. Woodward Avenue, a major a north–south thoroughfare, serves as a demarcation for neighborhood areas on the east side and west side of the city.

Map

Areas and neighborhoods

Downtown 

Downtown Detroit is the city's central business district and a residential area, bordered by M-10 (Lodge Freeway) to the west, the Interstate 75 (I-75, Fisher Freeway) to the north, I-375 (Chrysler Freeway) to the east, and the Detroit River to the south. The area contains many of the prominent skyscrapers in Detroit, including the Renaissance Center, the Penobscot Building, and the Guardian Building. The downtown area features high-rise residential living along with a number of parks including those linked by a promenade along the International Riverfront. Downtown Detroit was named among the best big city neighborhoods in which to retire by CNN Money Magazine editors.

The Detroit Opera House is located at Broadway and Grand Circus. The east necklace of Downtown links Grand Circus and the stadium area to Greektown along Broadway. The east necklace contains a sub-district sometimes called the Harmonie Park District, which has taken on the renowned legacy of Detroit's music from 1930s through the 1950s to the present. Near the Opera House and emanating from Grand Circus along the east necklace are other venues including the Music Hall Center for the Performing Arts and the Gem Theatre and Century Club. The historic Harmonie Club and Harmonie Centre are located along Broadway. The Harmonie Park area ends near Gratiot and Randolph. The Detroit Athletic Club stands in view of center field at Comerica Park. Part of the east necklace, the area contains architecturally notable buildings planned for renovation as high-rise residential condominiums such as the Gothic Revival Metropolitan Building at 33 John R St. The Hilton Garden Inn is also in the Harmonie Park area. The east necklace area is serviced by the People Mover at Cadillac station and Broadway station.

Greektown is located less than half a mile (800 m) from the Renaissance Center in the downtown area. The neighborhood is a popular restaurant and entertainment district, having many restaurants that serve Greek cuisine, as well as Hollywood Casino, one of three casino resorts in the city. Certain buildings on Monroe Street are themed to resemble the Parthenon, Pegasus, and other forms of Greek architecture. Greek music is also played on Monroe Street throughout the day. Well-known restaurants include The Laikon Cafe, Cyprus Taverna, Pegasus Taverna, and Pizza Papalis. St. Mary Roman Catholic Church, founded by German immigrants, is located in the heart of the district. The Second Baptist Church once served as "station" for the Underground Railroad. The Detroit People Mover has a station at the Hollywood Casino on Beaubien Street between Monroe Street and Lafayette Boulevard.

Midtown 

Midtown Detroit is an area covering roughly two square miles between Downtown Detroit to the south and New Center to the north along Woodward Avenue. Its boundaries are the Ford, Chrysler, Fisher, and Lodge Freeways. It includes the Art Center and the Medical Center in the northeast quadrant, most of Wayne State University's campus, the Detroit Public Library, and the Detroit Historical Museum in the northwest, and the Cultural Center including various restaurants, galleries, newly constructed lofts/condos and nightlife venues along Woodward in the center, among other things. While the academic core of the Wayne State campus is entirely within Midtown, the campus has expanded outside the boundaries stated here. The academic campus also includes a small area north of the Ford Freeway in New Center; the school's athletic facilities are west of the Lodge Freeway and can be considered part of either Midtown or the adjacent Woodbridge neighborhood.

Art Center two Miles (3 km) north of downtown, is centered on the Cultural Center Historic District, which is listed in the National Register of Historic Places. The Cultural Center is roughly bounded by Cass Avenue to the west, I-75 to the east, I-94 to the north and Warren Avenue to the south. It also includes the East Ferry Avenue Historic District. Attractions include the Detroit Institute of Arts, the Charles H. Wright Museum of African American History, the Scarab Club, the Detroit Historical Museum, the Museum of Contemporary Art Detroit, the main library of the Detroit Public Library system and the Detroit Science Center. The College for Creative Studies is located adjacent the Scarab Club and opposite the East face of the Detroit Institute of Arts. The main campus of Wayne State University is located adjacent to the area, on the opposite side of Woodward.

New Center area 

New Center is a commercial and residential historic district located uptown in Detroit, adjacent to Midtown, one mile (1.6 km) north of the Cultural Center, and approximately three miles (5 km) north of Downtown. The area is centered just west of the intersection of Woodward Avenue and Grand Boulevard, and is approximately bounded by the Virginia Park Historic District on the north, the Edsel Ford Freeway (I-94) on the south, John R Street on the east and the Lodge Freeway on the west.

North 
The northern area includes the Detroit Golf Club and neighborhoods which surround the main campus of the University of Detroit Mercy: Pilgrim Village; Palmer Park Apartment Building Historic District; and the Palmer Woods Historic District. Pilgrim Village, developed in the 1920s, is bounded by Livernois, Idaho, Puritan and Fenkell. It is the birthplace of the Honey Baked Ham Company, which started on Fenkell in 1957. Palmer Park Apartment Building Historic District along with the nearby Palmer Woods Historic District are located within the area. Adjacent to the neighborhood is a 140-acre (0.6 km²) park named Palmer Park. The neighborhood and the park were the property of Thomas Witherell Palmer. The neighborhood consists of stately apartment buildings as well as some single-family detached homes.

Palmer Woods is known for its elm-lined streets, large brick homes, and Tudor style architecture. Palmer Woods is located on the west side of Detroit. It is bordered by 7 Mile Road, M-102 (8 Mile Road), M-1 (Woodward Avenue), and the Sherwood Forest neighborhood. Lots are large, with ample room for trees, play equipment, and a good expanse of grass. It is the home of physicians, academics, business owners, artists, executives and their families.

East

Upper

Central

Lower

West

North

Central

Southwest / Near West 
Detroit Public Library operates the Bowen Branch Library at 3648 West Vernor Highway. On December 28, 1912, the branch opened in its current location. The area includes the historic Michigan Central Station and the Ambassador Bridge.

Index

See also

 Woodward Corridor

Notes

Further reading

External links 

 Detroit1701
 A Detroit Neighborhood Guide Commissioned by Palmer Moving and Storage
 DetroitMidtown.com
 Downtown Detroit Partnership
 Historic Boston-Edison Association
 Model D Media
 New Center Council
 Bagley Community Council
 Sherwood Forest Historic District
 Experience Detroit
 University District

 01
Neighborhoods
Detroit
.01
Culture of Detroit